Through a Glass Darkly may refer to:

"Through a glass, darkly" (phrase), a Biblical phrase from 1 Corinthians 13:12

Film 
 Through a Glass Darkly (film), a 1961 film by Ingmar Bergman

Literature

Fiction 
 Through a Glass, Darkly, a 1950 novel by Helen McCloy
 Through a Glass Darkly, a 1955 novel by Kathleen Norris
 Through a Glass Darkly, a 1965 play by Joe de Graft
 Through a Glass Darkly (Koen novel), 1986, by Karleen Koen
 Through a Glass, Darkly (Gaarder novel), 1993, by Jostein Gaarder
 Through a Glass Darkly, a 1999 novel by Gilbert Morris
 Through a Glass, Darkly, a 2006 novel by Donna Leon

Non-fiction 
 "Through a Glass Darkly: Trying to Understand the Scriptures", a 1986 scholarly article by Royal Skousen
 Through a Glass Darkly, a lecture by George Steiner delivered as the 1987 Huizinga Lecture
 Through a Glass Darkly: The Life of Patrick Hamilton, a 1990 biography by Nigel H. Jones
 Through a Glass Darkly: American Views of the Chinese Revolution, a 2006 book by William H. Hinton

Poetry 
 Through a Glass, Darkly, a poem by Arthur Hugh Clough, published posthumously in 1869
 "Through a Glass, Darkly" (poem), a 1922 poem by George S. Patton
 Through a Glass Darkly, a 1932 poetry collection by Sonia Raiziss
 Through a Glass Darkly, a 2008 poetry collection by Don Maclennan

Music 
 Through a Glass Darkly (album), a 1978 album by Peter Howell
 Through a Glass Darkly, a 1999 album by David Olney
 "Through a Glass, Darkly", a song by Hammock from Kenotic (2005)
 Through a Glass, Darkly (musical), an oratorio by Michael Shaieb; premiered in 2008
 "Through a Glass Darkly", a 2010 program by the Blue Devils Drum and Bugle Corps
 "Through a Glass Darkly", a song cycle by Thomas Sleeper; premiered in 2011

Television
 "Through a Glass Darkly", a 1968 episode of Haunted
 "Through a Glass, Darkly", a 1996, season 4 episode of Highlander
 "Through a Glass, Darkly", a 1996 episode of Lois and Clark: The New Adventures of Superman
 "Through a Glass Darkly", a 1998, season 3 episode of Millennium
 "Through a Glass Darkly", a 2005 episode of Andromeda
 "Through a Glass Darkly", a 2006 episode of Dark Oracle
 "The Big One" (Dexter), the 2010, fifth season finale of Dexter, erroneously promoted by fans as "Through a Glass, Darkly"
 "Through a Glass Darkly", a 2011 episode of Flashpoint
 "Through a Glass, Darkly", a 2015 episode of Pretty Little Liars
 "Through a Glass Darkly", a 2015, season 2 episode of The Musketeers
 "Through a Glass, Darkly", a 2015 season 3 episode of Masters of Sex
 "Through a Glass, Darkly", a 2016, season 2 episode of Outlander
 "Through a Glass, Darkly", a 2021, season 4 episode of Snowfall

See also 
 Allegory of the Cave, a parable by Plato in The Republic,  375 BC
 In a Glass Darkly, an 1872 collection of short stories by Sheridan Le Fanu
 "In a Glass, Darkly", a story by Agatha Christie included in her 1939 collection The Regatta Mystery
 Through a Glass, Clearly, a 1967 collection of short stories by Isaac Asimov
 Through the Past, Darkly (Big Hits Vol. 2), a 1969 compilation album by The Rolling Stones
 "Through a Lass Darkly", a short story in the 1975 collection Warm Worlds and Otherwise, by James Tiptree Jr. (Alice Sheldon)
 A Scanner Darkly, a 1977 novel by Philip K. Dick
 A Scanner Darkly (film), a 2006 adaptation of Dick's novel
The Passion of Darkly Noon, a 1995 horror film directed by Philip Ridley whose eponymous character takes his name from the phrase
 "Through a Lens Darkly", a 1996 episode of Nowhere Man
 Through the Glass Darkly, the 1997 third sourcebook for the roleplaying game Nightbane
 "Through a Lens Darkly", an season 3 (1999) episode of Daria
 And Now We See but Through a Glass Darkly, a 2003 dark chamber symphony by Justin Lassen
 "In a Mirror, Darkly", a 2005 episode of Star Trek Enterprise
 "", a song by ambient drone band Natural Snow Buildings, from The Dance of the Moon and the Sun (2006)
 Through a Glass Productions, an American film and video production company
 "Through the Glass Darkly", a 2007 song by Annie Lennox from Songs of Mass Destruction